The Middleborough Center Historic District is a historic district in Middleborough, Massachusetts, United States. It encompasses the center of the town, whose most significant period of growth was between about 1850 and 1920. It is roughly bounded by a former Conrail railroad line, Frank, Pierce, School, North Streets, Nemasket Road, and East Grove Street. The district was added to the National Register of Historic Places in 2000.

See also
National Register of Historic Places listings in Plymouth County, Massachusetts

References

Historic districts in Plymouth County, Massachusetts
Middleborough, Massachusetts
National Register of Historic Places in Plymouth County, Massachusetts
Historic districts on the National Register of Historic Places in Massachusetts